Kariyamanickam is a panchayat village in Nettapakkam Commune in the Union Territory of Puducherry, India. It is also a revenue village under Nettapakkam firka. Molapakkam is a part of Kariyamanickam village.

Geography
Kariyamanickam is bordered by Maducarai in the west, Sooramangalam in the north,  Earipakkam in the east and Chokkampattu village, (Tamil Nadu) in the south

Transport
Kariyamanickam is located at 28 km. from Pondicherry. Kariyamanickam  can be reached directly by any bus running between Pondicherry and Maducarai.

Road Network
Kariyamanickam is connected to Pondicherry by Mangalam -  Maducarai State Highway (RC-19). Kariyamanickam is also connected by Frontier State Highway (RC-21).

Politics
Kariyamanickam is a part of Nettapakkam (Union Territory Assembly constituency) which comes under Puducherry (Lok Sabha constituency).

References

External links
 Official website of the Government of the Union Territory of Puducherry

Villages in Puducherry district